Blauw and blauwe is Dutch for blue. It may refer to:

People
Piet Blauw (1937–2019), Dutch politician

Places
Blauwbrug, Amsterdam, Netherlands
Blauwe Theehuis, Vondelpark, Amsterdam, Netherlands
Blauwe Meer, Drenthe, Netherlands
Blauwestad, Groningen, Netherlands

Other uses
"Blauw", a 1991 song by Dutch band The Scene
Amsterdams Blauw, a clothing line by Scotch & Soda (clothing)

See also

 
 
Blau (disambiguation)
Blaw (disambiguation)
Blue (disambiguation)